Podrinje is a village in Croatia, located in the municipality of Markušica. It is connected by the D518 highway.

According to the 1991 census, the village was inhabited by a majority of Serbs (94.33%), and minority of Croats (3%).

References

Populated places in Vukovar-Syrmia County
Populated places in Syrmia
Joint Council of Municipalities
Serb communities in Croatia